Attilio Bernasconi (29 September 1905 – 17 April 1971) was an Argentine footballer (1933–1938) who played as a forward.

Career
Born in Buenos Aires, Bernasconi played as a forward for Newell's Old Boys in Argentina from 1933 to 1934, Torino F.C. in Turin, Italy from 1934 to 1935, and then moved to France where he played for Stade Rennais F.C. from 1935 to 1937 and Olympique Lillois from 1937 to 1938. Bernasconi also had a brief stint with A.S. Casale Calcio in Serie C. His professional football ended Jul 1, 1938

He had two caps playing for the Argentina national team.

He died in Orchies in northern France in 1971.

References

External links
 
 Profile at Enciclopediadelcalcio.it

1905 births
1971 deaths
Footballers from Buenos Aires
Argentina international footballers
Argentine footballers
French footballers
Association football forwards
Newell's Old Boys footballers
Torino F.C. players
Stade Rennais F.C. players
Casale F.B.C. players
Argentine emigrants to France
Argentine people of Italian descent
Olympique Lillois players